Dragon View is a side-scrolling role-playing beat 'em up released for the Super Nintendo Entertainment System in November 1994. It uses the same pseudo-3D overworld system for which the series is most famous. Other features of Dragon View are its side-view action role-playing game (RPG) hybrid gameplay (used when exploring more detailed areas such as towns and dungeons), its well translated first-person storyline, and its emphasis on player-driven undirected exploration. In 2019, the game was re-released through emulation for Windows. In 2022, a reproduction SNES cartridge was released by Limited Run Games.

Gameplay

The Drakkhen series' most recognizable feature is its custom overworld engine. First used by the original Amiga version of Drakkhen, it was later used in the PC and SNES ports. The Dragon View version sports basic terrain shading and mountainlike "boundaries" that enclose areas of the continent. While not "True 3D", the overworld engine simulates depth on its own (without the aid of supplementary hardware such as the Super FX chip) using sprite scaling and rudimentary rendering. This system is able to run smoothly on standard SNES hardware because little more than half of the total screen area is ever in use. Since the top and bottom panels are completely static during overworld navigation, all hardware power is focused on rendering the first-person view. Even so, framerates can suffer as many sprites are sometimes present on a single screen.

Reception

Notes

References

Works cited

External links

1994 video games
Action role-playing video games
Kemco games
Piko Interactive games
Role-playing video games
Super Nintendo Entertainment System games
Video games about dragons
Video games developed in Japan
Windows games